The KSAFA Championship League  also known for sponsorship purposes as the Campari/KSAFA Championship League  , is a men's second division football league, it’s sanctioned by the Jamaican Football Federation. The league is contested between 12 clubs that are based in the parishes of St. Andrew and Kingston, it operates on a system of promotion and relegation where as at the end of each season the two lowest placed teams are relegated to KSAFA Major League.

At the end of each season the winners qualify for the National Premier League Playoff along with the winners of the South Central Confederation Super League, Eastern Confederation Super League and Western Confederation Super League.

These four teams play each other, home and away, with the top two teams from this playoff being promoted to the Jamaica National Premier League.

Member teams 2010-11
August Town F.C.
Barbican F.C.
Bull Bay F.C.
Cavalier S.C.
Constant Spring F.C.
Duhaney Park F.C.
Mountain View United F.C.
Rae Town F.C.
Real Mona F.C.
Rockfort F.C.
Santos F.C.
UWI
Jamaica Defence Force  Will not play due to domestic military duties.

Member teams 2018-19
Barbican F.C.
Browns Town F.C.
Central Kingston F.C.
Maverly/Hughenden F.C.
Maxfield Park F.C.
Molynes United F.C.
Mountain View F.C.
Pembroke Hall F.C.
Rae Town F.C
Real Mona F.C.
Rockfort F.C.
Santos F.C.

Past Champions 

 2018: Molynes United
 2017: Cavalier S.C.
 2016: Maverley Hughenden
 2015: UWI F.C.
 2014: Barbican F.C.
 2013: August Town F.C.
 2012: Cavalier S.C.
 2011: Cavalier S.C.
 2010: Pembroke Hall F.C
 2009: August Town F.C.
 2008: Meadhaven United F.C.
 2007: Police Nationals F.C.
 2006: August Town F.C.
 2005: Boys' Town F.C.
 2004: Santos F.C.

References

2
Jam